Strymoniko is a village and a former municipality in the Serres regional unit, Greece. Since the 2011 local government reform it is part of the municipality Irakleia, of which it is a municipal unit. The municipal unit has an area of 156.850 km2. Population 3,918 (2011).

References

Populated places in Serres (regional unit)

bg:Орляк (дем)
el:Δήμος Στρυμωνικού